Lee Greenwood is an American country music singer. His discography includes 22 studio albums, eight compilation albums, 40 singles (counting his signature song "God Bless the USA", which was released three times), and five music videos. Of his singles, seven have reached Number One on the Billboard Hot Country Songs charts: "Somebody's Gonna Love You" and "Going, Going Gone" from 1983, "Dixie Road" and "I Don't Mind the Thorns (If You're the Rose)" from 1985, "Don't Underestimate My Love for You", "Hearts Aren't Made to Break (They're Made to Love)" and "Mornin' Ride" from 1986.

Studio albums

1980s

1990s

2000s

Compilation albums

Singles

1980s

1990s and 2000s

Music videos

References

External links

Country music discographies
Discographies of American artists